The Lap Engine is a beam engine designed by James Watt, built by Boulton and Watt in 1788. It is now preserved at the Science Museum, London.

It is important as both an early example of a beam engine by Boulton and Watt, and also mainly as illustrating an important innovative step in their development for its ability to produce rotary motion.

The engines name comes from its use in Matthew Boulton's Soho Manufactory, where it was used to drive a line of 43 polishing or lapping machines, used for the production of buttons and buckles.

Innovations 

Watt did not invent the steam engine and there is no single 'Watt steam engine' as such. He developed a number of separate innovations, each of which improved the existing engines of the day, beginning with Newcomen's.  The Lap Engine of 1788, also the Whitbread Engine (1785), represent survivors of the first engines to show all of Watt's major improvements in one.

Parallel motion

Rotative beam engines

Sun and planet gear 

The rotative beam engine needs a means to convert reciprocating motion of the piston and beam to rotary motion. The crankshaft was well known for centuries before Watt, mostly from its use in mining machinery powered by water wheels. However its use for a steam engine was covered by James Pickard's patent at this time. Watt was unwilling to pay a license fee to use the crank and so sought an alternative. The sun and planet gear was invented by another Scottish engineer, William Murdoch, an employee of Boulton and Watt. Watt patented it in October 1781.

The sun and planet gear is a simple epicyclic gear. The planet is attached rigidly to the end of the connecting rod, hung from the beam. As it rotates it applies a torque to the sun gear, just as for a crank, and so causes it to rotate. As the two gears also rotate relative to each other, like conventional gearwheels, this has the effect of giving the sun gear a further rotation. The sun, and the output crankshaft, thus rotates twice for every piston cycle of the engine, twice as fast as with a conventional crank. Beam engines were slow-moving and the output shafts driven by the Lap Engine were fast-moving, so this was an advantage.

Centrifugal governor 

According to the Science Museum, it was the first steam engine to be fitted with a centrifugal governor.

History

Preservation

Notes

References

Further reading 
 

Preserved beam engines

Steam engines in the Science Museum, London
Preserved stationary steam engines
1788 in England
1788 in science
Industrial Revolution
History of the steam engine
James Watt